Winona School District may refer to:

 Winona Independent School District, based in Winona, Texas 
 Winona Separate School District, based in Winona, Mississippi
 Winona Area Public Schools, in Winona, Minnesota